Siddhicharan is a municipality and the district headquarter of Okhaldhunga District in Province No. 1 of Nepal that was established in May 2014 by merging the two former Village development committees Andheri, Thulachhap, Jyamire, Salleri, Rumjatar and Okhaldhunga. It is named after the Nepali poet Siddhicharan Shrestha.

Demographics
At the time of the 2011 Nepal census, Siddhicharan Municipality had a population of 28,844. Of these, 65.5% spoke Nepali, 10.5% Sherpa, 7.7% Magar, 6.5% Bahing, 3.3% Tamang, 2.1% Rai, 0.9% Gurung, 0.7% Maithili, 0.6% Bhujel and 2.2% other languages as their first language.

In terms of ethnicity/caste, 17.8% were Chhetri, 14.0% Hill Brahmin, 13.3% Magar, 11.3% Sherpa, 8.6% Newar, 5.1% Rai, 5.0% Gurung, 4.3% Kami, 3.8% Tamang and 16.8% others.

In terms of religion, 72.8% were Hindu, 19.0% Buddhist, 7.1% Kirati, 0.7% Christian, 0.1% Prakriti and 0.3% others.

Transportation  
Rumjatar Airport lies in Old-Rumjatar offering flights to Lukla and Kathmandu.

References

External links
UN map of the municipalities of Okhaldhunga District

Populated places in Okhaldhunga District
Municipalities in Koshi Province
Nepal municipalities established in 2014
Municipalities in Okhaldhunga District